Scarface Mountain is a mountain summit located in Pondera County, Montana.

References

Mountains of Montana
Landforms of Pondera County, Montana
North American 2000 m summits